FM (Film Müzikleri) is the fourth album by the Turkish band Replikas. The album is a compilation of two movie soundtracks: Maruf by Serdar Akar (2001) and İki Genç Kız by Kutluğ Ataman (2005). With İki Genç Kız, Replikas won the best soundtrack album award by SİYAD (Cinema Critics Association).

Track listing
 Aa
 Siyah Deri Ceket
 Restoran
 Topal Ruh
 Tuzla Blues
 Leblebici Horror
 .
 Corazon Banana Bossanovası
 Maruf
 Hayırlı Olsun
 Kavga
 Abdül
 Bilge
 İffet
 Kavga II
 Kabir
 Maruf II
 Doğum
 Hayalet
 Cankız
 Ateş
 Meydan
 Anneme Yemek Yedirmem Lazım
 Bozuk İlahi
 Hayırlı Olsun II

Line up
Gökçe Akçelik
Selçuk Artut
Orçun Baştürk
Barkın Engin
Erden Özer Yalçınkaya

External links
İki Genç Kız IMDB page
Maruf IMDB page

2006 albums
Replikas albums